M. arctica may refer to:
 Melangyna arctica, a hoverfly species found in Europe
 Marsupella arctica, the Arctic rustwort, a liverwort species found in the Northern Hemisphere

See also 
 Arctica (disambiguation)